Wellington Independent School District is a public school district based in Wellington, Texas (USA).  Located in Collingsworth County, the district extends into a portion of Childress County.  In 2009, the school district was rated "academically acceptable" by the Texas Education Agency.

On July 2, 2012 Samnorwood Independent School District was consolidated into Wellington ISD.

Schools
Wellington High School
Wellington Junior High School
Wellington Elementary School

References

External links
 Wellington ISD

School districts in Collingsworth County, Texas
School districts in Childress County, Texas